Ysabella is a 2007 Philippine drama television series starring Judy Ann Santos, Coney Reyes, Ryan Agoncillo and Derek Ramsay. The series debuted on ABS-CBN from June 25, 2007 to January 18, 2008, replacing Maria Flordeluna and was replaced by Palos.

The series is streaming online on YouTube.

Synopsis
The story revolves around a young cook named Ysabella Cuenca. At an early age, Ysabella develops an inclination for cooking, and dreams of becoming a great cook like her mother, Rosario Cuenca.

However, her mother's misfortune causes Ysabella to taste the bitterness of life. This teaches her to be meticulous and devoted to her cooking; and cynical when it comes to love. She grows with one goal in mind—to be the best cook in their area and exact revenge on the woman who was responsible for her mother's misery.

Along the way, Ysabella meets three men who will show her how sweet it is to fall in love. Who will give her the right mixture of happiness? Will it be the cocky, street-smart Andrew Amarillo, the hot chef Mito Valenzuela or the serious but sensitive Albert?

Cast

Protagonist 
 Judy Ann Santos as Ysabella "Ysay" Cuenca- the cook who loves to cook. In her kitchen, she looks like a queen who has everything she cooks well.  So, she is a bit weak when it comes to love. Ysay and Victoria are leading a culinary competition for a one hundred million dollar contract for  Prince Hugo to franchise the worst Chicken Inasal recipe worldwide for the rightful chicken roast recipe internationally Ysay won and Victoria had a madness of her heart.

 Antagonist 
 Coney Reyes as Victoria Amarillo - Top Chef of "Florencia's" and owner of the "Victoria's Corporation". However, despite her success, she almost lost everything prompting her to do anything to salvage her success. After the competition to which she lost, she sent Cristina to kill Ysay.

 Lead cast 
Ryan Agoncillo as Andrew Amarillo† and Albert Amarillo†- Andrew was a man who continued his love for Ysay until his death. Albert, his twin brother, introduced himself as Andrew so that he could avenge his brother's death.  Because of her love for Ysay, she told him this. Later he was shot by Cristina & dies for Ysay.
Derek Ramsay as Mito Valenzuela- "The Sexiest Chef on TV" is Ysay's "first love."  After recovering from his broken arm in [the United States], he returned to the Philippines to build Ysay's dream restaurant for his deceased mother, and to restore his former love with Ysay.

 Main Cast 
Gina Pareño as Trinidad "Trining" Mendoza - Ysabella's second mother who is unrelenting to establish the needs of her family. She also took charge of the Ysay's restaurant.
Aiza Seguerra as Alex Mendoza - The closest friend of Ysay. But there is a test to test the closeness of the two. She wants Tere. But she had a boyfriend. She has a minor jealousy in him. But despite this, Tere was still don't know that Alex likes her.
Valeen Montenegro as Lima Amarillo-Valenzuela - an obedient daughter of Victoria and the sister of Albert and Andrew, and she tasted the first love for Jordan and also focused her heart with Reno. Later she married Jordan after Reno's death.
Aldred Gatchalian as Jordan Valenzuela - The younger brother of Mito His love is granted only to the woman she loves and that is Lima luckily, she married Lima after Reno's death
Jason Abalos as Reno† - The mysterious man who claims Ysay as the "caretaker" Eventually, he returned to Manila to work he lima develop feelings for him but unfortunately, he died cause of brain tumor

Supporting cast
Desiree Del Valle as Cristina Mancado† - Former girlfriend of Andrew Amarillo. They have a son named "Tingloy". In the end, Cristina attempted to kill Ysay but Cristina shoots Albert while saving Ysay and she was killed by the police.
Pokwang as Phuket  - Victoria's honest right-hand. She is the only person who knows the real life of Victoria.
Kat Alano as Georgia Rodriguez - The women love to get the what she wants even if she hurt someone.
Jeffrey Santos as Apolinario Reyes - The attendant of the "farm" by Andrew.
Sitti Navarro as Tere - The woman Alex wants but she has a "boyfriend".
Lito Pimentel as Homer - Victoria's staff 
Olyn Membian as Bonnie - Lima's secretary
Juan Rodrigo as Fernando - Victoria's love interest
Perla Bautista as Guadalupe "Lupe" Montalban† - Victoria's mother
Spanky Manikan† as Perry Mendoza† - Trining's husband
Isabel Blaesi
Benjamin Alves
Michael Conan

 Special participation 
Angelica Panganiban as Venice - The woman accidentally likes Mito.
Rosanna Roces as Rosario Cuenca† - teach her daughter Ysay to cook. She gave less stolen recipe book with Ysay, the wick of her early death. She is married to Abdul and the mother of Ysabella.
Mhyco Aquino as Noel - Norman's Son
Freddie Webb as Norman† - Rosario's boyfriend
Phoemela Baranda as herself / a reporter
Ethel Booba as Darna - Mito's co host on his show.
Mickey Ferriols One of the co-host of Mito
Evangeline Pascual as Mrs. Valenzuela - Mito and Jordan's mother
Andre Tiangco as Mr. Valenzuela - Mito and Jordan's father
Sonny Parsons as the Barangay Chairman
Leo Rialp as Prince Hugo
Roderick Paulate as himself/host
Carla Martinez as Sophia Amarillo - Victoria's sister and her enemy.
Sharlene San Pedro as Young Alex
Jairus Aquino as Young Andrew and Albert
Celine Lim as Young Ysabella
Christian Vasquez as Young Norman
Maricel Laxa as Young Victoria
Gardo Versoza as Young Perry
Neri Naig as Young Lupe
Nadia Montenegro as Young Trining
Morissette as Duwendita

Critical acclaim
Ysabella received three nominations from the 2008 PMPC Star Awards for Television. Judy Ann Santos and Coney Reyes garnered Best Drama Actress nods while the show itself is included in the roster of Best Primetime Drama Series citations.

Broadcast timeYsabella became infamous as its timeslot was shuffled around by ABS-CBN to give way to dramas geared towards younger demographics.

June 25-August 3 (Episodes 1-30): Monday-Friday 7:45-8:30 p.m.
August 6-August 31 (Episodes 31-50): Monday-Friday 8:30-9:15 p.m. (to give way for Kokey)
September 3-September 21 (Episodes 51-65): Monday-Thursday 9:15-10:00 p.m. & Friday 9:00-9:30 p.m. (to give way for Pangarap na Bituin)
September 24-October 5 (Episodes 66-75): Monday-Thursday 9:45-10:30 & Friday 10:00-10:30 p.m. (to give way for Lastikman)
October 8-December 7 (Episodes 76-120): Monday-Thursday 10:30-11:00 p.m. & Friday 9:30-10:00 p.m. (to give way for Pinoy Big Brother: Celebrity Edition 2)
December 10-January 18 (Episodes 121-150): Monday-Thursday 9:45-10:30 p.m. & Friday 9:30-10:00 p.m. (to give way for Maging Sino Ka Man: Ang Pagbabalik'')

References

External links
ABS-CBN Official Website
ABS-CBN Ysabella
Ysabella: Teleserye on Demand

See also
List of programs broadcast by ABS-CBN
List of ABS-CBN drama series

ABS-CBN drama series
2007 Philippine television series debuts
2008 Philippine television series endings
Television series by Star Creatives
Filipino-language television shows
Television shows set in the Philippines